Halsbury's Laws of Hong Kong is an  encyclopaedia on the laws of Hong Kong based on the model of the Halsbury's Laws of England and is currently the only encyclopaedic legal work in Hong Kong. It covers 80 subject areas and is written by prominent legal experts in Hong Kong.

Related publications
Halsbury's Laws of England
Halsbury's Laws of Australia
Halsbury's Laws of Canada
Halsbury's Laws of Singapore
Halsbury's Laws of Malaysia
Halsbury's Laws of India
Halsbury's Laws of New Zealand
The Laws of Scotland: Stair Memorial Encyclopaedia

References

External links
Can There Be a Civil Case Along With a Criminal Case?

Law of Hong Kong
Halsbury's Laws
Encyclopedias of law